WVCP is the college radio station of Volunteer State Community College ("Vol State") in Gallatin, Tennessee, broadcasting at 88.5 MHz on the FM dial. It falls under the oversight of the Department of Communication and is managed by Marconi-winning faculty member Dianna Kelly Monk. Students and volunteers make up the airstaff. The station plays a mix of classic hits, ranging from the 60s to 90s.

Storm damage
Its studios on the second floor of Noble Caudill Hall were directly in the path of a large tornado that struck the college and killed nine people across the city of Gallatin on April 7, 2006, during the April 6–8, 2006 Tornado Outbreak. Part of the building collapsed, and WVCP's studios were a near-total loss. Equipment that was not destroyed by the storm sustained heavy water damage.

The station was knocked off the air the moment the storm struck, but returned to the air on April 13, 2006, in a limited capacity. The station is currently automating from a computer located at the transmitter site. During the Spring 2007 semester, WVCP again began operating at full capacity from a newly constructed studio in the Ramer Administration Building.

A few years earlier, strong straight-line winds caused the station's tower north of Gallatin to topple, forcing WVCP off the air for several weeks before the station relaunched on a new tower in a different location.

HD programming
WVCP broadcasts using HD radio technology. 
 HD1 is a digital version of the analog signal broadcast on 88.5 MHz, while 
 HD2 offers a fresh country format, with country hits less than five years old, all researched by students. The station is also working more closely with the college's recording program to air music projects played, recorded, and produced by students of the college, and airs a weekly show featuring fresh, locally-produced country music. The HD2 channel is also streamed online.

See also
 List of Nashville media

References

External links
 WVCP official site

VCP
VCP
VCP